Central College Bengaluru (1858) is one of the oldest colleges in India. This college was originally affiliated to University of Mysore in Mysore State. Rev. John Garrett was the first principal of the Central High School, which was afterwards renamed Central College. In 1964, with the reorganization of the Indian state and the formation of Karnataka, Central College was transferred to Bangalore University, a new university formed in 1965 to meet the needs of the people of Bengaluru. Initially, the two  colleges of the city, the Central College (CC) and the University Visvesvaraya College of Engineering (UVCE) formed the nucleus of Bangalore University.

History
The Central College, Bengaluru was started in 1886 by the British government to award University Degrees. It was renamed as the Bangalore University from Central College, Bangalore by the University Grants Commission (India) on 10 July 1964 by the government under the then State of Mysore to consolidate institutions of higher education in the city of Bangalore. The Bangalore University, which was created out of University of Mysore in 1964, was operated for many years from the Central College till 1973, when the Jnana Bharathi campus was established. Sir C. V. Raman, Nobel Laureate Physicist, was associated with the University while working at the Indian Institute of Science. He had announced his Nobel winning work at the University premises based in Central College, Bengaluru in 1927. He was awarded the Nobel prize in 1930. The Central College Campus retained as the City Campus of Bangalore University houses the City offices of the Vice Chancellor, Registrar, Registrar (Evaluation), Finance (Examination part), UGC Academic Staff College, Directorate of Correspondence Courses and Distance Education Centre, Directorate of College Development Council, Directorate of Physical Education and a few post graduate departments and support services, with a state of the art Jnana Jyothi Auditorium. Besides, the Central College also has the Central College Cricket Pavilion where the Karnataka State Cricket Association was first established and trained several cricketers of International repute.

Notable Teachers
 B. S. Madhava Rao, Principal (1952–55) of Central College and Professor of Mathematics
 L. Rama Rao, Principal of Central College and Professor of Geology.
 E. P. Metcalfe, Principal of Central College
 P. C. Mahalanobis
 C. N. S. Iyengar, Founder Head of the Department of Mathematics, Karnataka University Dharwad
 John Guthrie Tait, Teacher of famous men including C. Rajagopalachari & Navaratna Rama Rao
 M. J. Thirumalachar, Shanti Swarup Bhatnagar laureate
 T. S. Venkannayya
 A. R. Krishnashastry

Notable students
 Bharat Ratna Sir M. Visvesvaraya
 Harshavardhan Mudaliar
 Bharat Ratna C. Rajagopalachari
 Bharat Ratna C. N. R. Rao, Indian chemist
 Shivakumara Swami
 Pusapati Vijayarama Gajapati Raju, Maharaja of Vizianagaram
 H. Narasimhaiah
 Guruswami Mudaliar
 Hospet Sumitra
 N. Santosh Hegde, Justice
 Navaratna Rama Rao, leading administrator, author and founder of the Sericulture Department
N. S. Subba Rao
 Maya Rao (1928-2014), Kathak guru 
 K. M. Koushik, politician
 Rajeshwari Chatterjee, pioneer in Indian microwave engineering
 Rahul Dravid, former India and Karnataka cricket player and captain
 B. G. L. Swamy, Indian botanist and Kannada writer.

References

Notes
 Bangalore University Website 

Kingdom of Mysore
Colleges in Bangalore
Science colleges in India
Academic institutions formerly affiliated with the University of Madras